André Albanez Rienzo (born July 5, 1988) is a Brazilian professional baseball pitcher for the Tecolotes de los Dos Laredos of the Mexican League. He previously played in Major League Baseball (MLB) for the Chicago White Sox and Miami Marlins. Rienzo represented Brazil in the 2013 World Baseball Classic. He became the first Brazilian-born pitcher to start and win an MLB game.

Early life
Rienzo was raised with his two older brothers by his mother in São Paulo, Brazil. Following his parents' divorce, Rienzo's mother decided that the best way to keep Rienzo and his brothers out of trouble was to follow the example of the large Japanese community in Brazil. Rienzo's mother played softball and her sons were among the few to play baseball in their area; in Brazil, both sports are niche sports primarily played by Japanese-Brazilians. A Cuban pitching coach and scout eventually helped Rienzo to develop his four-pitch arsenal.

Professional career

Chicago White Sox
The Chicago White Sox signed Rienzo as an international free agent on November 17, 2006. He played in 7 games (3 starts) for the Dominican Summer League White Sox 2, where he went 1–1 with a 7.63 ERA, striking out 22 in 15.1 innings. Rienzo split 2008 with the DSL White Sox 1 and 2, where in 8 games (7 starts), he went 5–1 with a 1.33 ERA, striking out 44 in 40.2 innings. Rienzo spent 2009 with Bristol White Sox of the Rookie-level Appalachian League, where in 13 games (9 starts), he went 2–6 with a 4.14 ERA, striking out 49 in 54.1 innings. Rienzo played 2010 with the Kannapolis Intimidators of the Class A South Atlantic League, where in 20 games (18 starts), he went 8–4 with a 3.65 ERA, striking out 125 in 101 innings.

Rienzo spent 2011 with the Winston-Salem Dash of the Class A-Advanced Carolina League, where in 25 games (22 starts), he went 6–5 with a 3.41 ERA, striking out 118 in 116 innings. He was named a Carolina League midseason All-Star. Rienzo began 2012 with Winston-Salem, but on April 26, Rienzo was suspended for 50 games following a positive test for metabolites of stanozolol. After the suspension, Rienzo pitched for the Birmingham Barons of the Class AA Southern League, and he also made a start in September for the Charlotte Knights of the Class AAA International League. In 18 total starts, he went 7–3 with a 2.53 ERA, striking out 113 in 103.1 innings. Rienzo pitched for the Salt River Rafters in the Arizona Fall League after the 2012 season, but he left early to join the Brazilian national baseball team in the 2013 World Baseball Classic qualifying round. The Chicago White Sox added Rienzo to their 40-man roster after the 2012 season.

Rienzo began 2013 with Charlotte, where he went 8–6 in 20 starts with a 4.06 ERA before being recalled on July 30 by the White Sox to make a spot start for Jake Peavy, who was scratched amid trade rumors. Rienzo made his major league debut against the Cleveland Indians pitching seven innings, giving up three unearned runs, three walks and six strikeouts, with a no-decision in a 7–4 loss to fellow Brazilian Yan Gomes' Indians. On August 21, 2013, Rienzo got his first Major League win in a 5–2 victory over the Kansas City Royals.

Miami Marlins
On December 11, 2014, the White Sox traded Rienzo to the Miami Marlins for Dan Jennings. On January 13, 2016, Rienzo was designated for assignment to make room for newly signed righty Edwin Jackson.  He was released on August 29, 2016.

San Diego Padres
On December 13, 2016, Rienzo signed a minor league contract with the San Diego Padres.
He served as ESPN Brasil commentator during the 2017 World Series. He elected free agency on November 6, 2017.

Acereros de Monclova
On June 12, 2018, Rienzo signed with the Acereros de Monclova of the Mexican League.

In 2018, André Rienzo led the Mexican Baseball League with an 0.76 ERA in 47.1 innings.

His 2019 season wasn't as good, posting a 5.59 ERA in 29 innings pitched.

Tecolotes de los Dos Laredos
On December 14, 2019, Rienzo was traded to the Tecolotes de los Dos Laredos of the Mexican League. Rienzo did not play in a game in 2020 due to the cancellation of the Mexican League season because of the COVID-19 pandemic.

International career
He was selected for Brazil national baseball team at the 2013 World Baseball Classic Qualification, 2013 World Baseball Classic, 2017 World Baseball Classic Qualification, 2019 Pan American Games Qualifier, and 2021 World Baseball Classic Qualifier.

References

External links

1988 births
Living people
Acereros de Monclova players
Birmingham Barons players
Brazilian expatriate baseball players in Mexico
Brazilian expatriate baseball players in the United States
Bristol White Sox players
Charlotte Knights players
Chicago White Sox players
Dominican Summer League White Sox players
El Paso Chihuahuas players
Gulf Coast Marlins players
Jacksonville Suns players
Jupiter Hammerheads players
Kannapolis Intimidators players
Leones del Escogido players
Brazilian expatriate baseball players in the Dominican Republic
Major League Baseball broadcasters
Major League Baseball pitchers
Major League Baseball players from Brazil
Mexican League baseball pitchers
Miami Marlins players
New Orleans Zephyrs players
Salt River Rafters players
Sportspeople from São Paulo
Tecolotes de los Dos Laredos players
Tiburones de La Guaira players
Brazilian expatriate baseball players in Venezuela
Winston-Salem Dash players
Yaquis de Obregón players
2013 World Baseball Classic players
American people of Brazilian descent